East Midlands was a constituency of the European Parliament in the United Kingdom, established in 1999 with six members to replace single-member districts. Between 2009 and the United Kingdom's withdrawal from the EU on 31 January 2020 it returned five MEPs, elected using the D'Hondt method of party-list proportional representation.

Boundaries 
The constituency corresponded to the East Midlands region of England, comprising the counties of Derbyshire, Nottinghamshire, Leicestershire, Rutland, Northamptonshire and most of Lincolnshire.

History 
The constituency was organised as a result of the European Parliamentary Elections Act 1999, replacing a number of single-member constituencies. These were Leicester, Northamptonshire and Blaby, Nottingham and Leicestershire North West, Nottinghamshire North and Chesterfield, and parts of Lincolnshire and Humberside South, Peak District, and Staffordshire East and Derby.

Returned members 

Notes:
1 Roger Helmer announced on 12 October 2011 his intention to stand down from the European Parliament. After uncertainty whether his place would be taken by the next person on the Conservative Party's list for the East Midlands region, he defected to UKIP and completed his term as MEP.

Complaint against Kilroy-Silk
In August 2005, four of the MEPs for the region (Clark, Heaton-Harris, Helmer and Whitehead) sent a joint letter to President of the European Parliament Josep Borrell to complain of Kilroy-Silk: 
"He seems to have done little or no work as a constituency MEP for the East Midlands. This leaves five MEPs to do the work of six and the electorate have been short-changed". They complained that Kilroy-Silk was not "fulfilling the pledge he made on becoming an MEP, to serve the electorate of his region" and to call for him to "either do the job for which he is paid, or get out and leave it to those who can."

The parliament has no power to remove Mr Kilroy-Silk, who is understood to have attended the minimum number of plenary sessions required to be eligible for his parliamentary allowances. Such a complaint was unprecedented. Kilroy-Silk refused to comment on it. The European Parliament does not have any power to expel a member, and Borrell took no action.

Election results 

Elected candidates are shown in bold.  Brackets indicate the number of votes per seat won.

2019

2014

2009

2004

1999

References

European Parliament constituencies in England (1999–2020)
Politics of Lincolnshire
East Midlands
1999 establishments in England
Constituencies established in 1999
Constituencies disestablished in 2020